Lafayette Hotel or Hotel Lafayette may refer to:

Hotel Lafayette, an historic hotel in Buffalo, New York built between 1902 and 1911
Hotel Lafayette (New York City), a hotel and restaurant which operated in New York City from 1902 to 1949
LaFayette Hotel, an historic hotel in Little Rock, Arkansas built in 1925
The Lafayette Hotel, Swim Club & Bungalows, a hotel in San Diego, California built in 1946
The Lafayette Hotel in Marietta, Ohio built in 1918

See also
Lafayette (disambiguation)